The Roman Catholic Archdiocese of Barranquilla is an archdiocese located in the city of Barranquilla in Colombia.

History
 7 July 1932: Established as Diocese of Barranquilla from the Archdiocese of Cartagena
 25 April 1969: Promoted as Metropolitan Archdiocese of Barranquilla

Special churches
Pro-Cathedral:
Pro-Catedral de San Nicolás de Tolentino

Bishops

Ordinaries, in reverse chronological order
 Archbishops of Barranquilla (Roman rite), below
 Archbishop Pablo Emiro Salas Anteliz (2017.11.14 - present)
 Archbishop Jairo Jaramillo Monsalve (2010.11.13 – 2017.11.14)
 Archbishop Jesús Salazar Gómez (1999.03.18 – 2010.07.08), appointed Archbishop of Bogotá (Cardinal in 2012)
 Archbishop Félix María Torres Parra (1987.05.11 – 1999.03.18)
 Archbishop Germán Villa Gaviria, C.I.M. (1969.04.25 – 1987.05.11); see below
 Bishops of Barranquilla (Roman rite), below
 Bishop Germán Villa Gaviria, C.I.M. (1959.02.03 – 1969.04.25); see above
 Bishop Francisco Gallego Pérez (1953.02.03 – 1958.12.18)
 Bishop Jesús Antonio Castro Becerra (1948.08.19 – 1952.12.18), appointed Bishop of Palmira
 Bishop Julio Caicedo Téllez, S.D.B. (1942.06.26 – 1948.02.23), appointed Bishop of Cali
 Bishop Luis Calixto Leiva Charry (1933.11.21 – 1939.05.16)

Auxiliary bishops
Carlos José Ruiseco Vieira (1971-1977), appointed Bishop of Montería
Hugo Eugenio Puccini Banfi (1977-1987), appointed Bishop of Santa Marta 
Oscar Aníbal Salazar Gómez (1995-1999), appointed Bishop of La Dorada-Guaduas 
Luis Antonio Nova Rocha (2002-2010), appointed Bishop of Facatativá
Victor Antonio Tamayo Betancourt (2003-2017)

Suffragan dioceses
 El Banco
 Riohacha
 Santa Marta
 Valledupar

See also
Roman Catholicism in Colombia

Sources

External links
 GCatholic.org
  Diocese website

Roman Catholic dioceses in Colombia
Roman Catholic Ecclesiastical Province of Barranquilla
Christian organizations established in 1932
Barranquilla
Roman Catholic dioceses and prelatures established in the 20th century